At  the Nußhardt is the third highest mountain in the Fichtel Mountains in the south German state of Bavaria. It lies in the far northeast of the state and has a rocky summit characteristic of the Fichtelgebirge (coarse-grained Kern Granite G3 and augen gneiss at the southeast end). In addition the Nußhardt is incorporated into the geotope register of the Bavarian State Geological Department under No. 472R013.

Location 

The Nußhardt lies on the FGV's main hill trail between the FGV hostel of Seehaus and the Schneeberg, the highest mountain in the range. The climbing area is looked after by the local FGV branch at Vordorf.

Legends 
On the rocky viewing point there are eight, small, bowl-shaped hollows in the granite; so-called druid bowls. In former centuries they were believed to be the sacrifice bowls for heathen cults. Today it is known that they are a special form of weathering in the granite. It is also worth mentioning the so-called Nußhardtstube ('Nußhardt parlour'), a roughly 50 m long covered chamber, whose low entrance is on the southern side of the rocks.

Name 
In the records of the Berneck office in 1536 the Nußhardt appears as Nusser, and again in a margraviate forest inspection report of 1536. Its spelling in the records and literature varies: Nusser, Nosser, Nußhardt – there has been no lack of interpretations for these names, but none has been really convincing.

Climbing area 
As early as 1880 the first steps to the highest point of the Nußhardt tor were erected by te Fichtelgebirge Branch of the German-Austrian Alpine Club to give "better views" of the Schneeberg, Ochsenkopf, the Fichtelsee, the Franconian Jura and the Kemnather Land.

Sources 
 Herrmann, Detmar : Lexikon Fichtelgebirge, Ackermann Verlag Hof/Saale
 Der Siebenstern, Vereinszeitschrift des Fichtelgebirgsvereins e. V., Theresienstraße 2, 95632 Wunsiedel

Maps:
Fritsch Wanderkarte 1:50.000

External links 
 Johann Wolfgang von Goethe was on the Nußhardt in the Fichtelgebirge

Mountains of Bavaria
Mountains of the Fichtelgebirge
Mountains under 1000 metres